Gurabo may refer to: 
Gurabo, Dominican Republic
Gurabo, Puerto Rico